The Beaver City Library in Beaver, Utah was built around 1917.  It was listed on the National Register of Historic Places in 1983.

It is a brick Carnegie library.

It was deemed significant in 1979 as "an excellent example of the Federalist Revival Style and is the only building designed so clearly in this style in Beaver. The building is one of a series of small town libraries built to enhance the cultural and educational life of rural areas by the Carnegie family. That it has remained totally unaltered until 1979 is a tribute to its excellent design and workmanship."

References

Carnegie libraries in Utah
National Register of Historic Places in Beaver County, Utah
Federal architecture in Utah
Library buildings completed in 1917
Libraries on the National Register of Historic Places in Utah